Émile Frantz (19 May 1910 – 22 May 1996) was a Luxembourgian wrestler. He competed in the men's Greco-Roman middleweight at the 1928 Summer Olympics. During World War II, he was imprisoned in both the Natzweiler-Struthof and Dachau concentration camps.

References

External links
 

1910 births
1996 deaths
Luxembourgian male sport wrestlers
Olympic wrestlers of Luxembourg
Wrestlers at the 1928 Summer Olympics
Sportspeople from Meurthe-et-Moselle